Ormond Beach (October 23, 1910 – September 9, 1938) was a star football player in the Ontario Rugby Football Union for four seasons for the Sarnia Imperials. Beach, who led the Imperials to Grey Cup victories in 1934 and 1936, died at the age of 27 in an industrial accident. He was inducted into the Canadian Football Hall of Fame in 1963.

References

1910 births
1938 deaths
People from Pawhuska, Oklahoma
American players of Canadian football
Players of American football from Oklahoma
Kansas Jayhawks football players
Canadian Football Hall of Fame inductees
Ontario Rugby Football Union players
Sarnia Imperials players
Accidental deaths in Ontario
Industrial accident deaths